Erythrobacter dokdonensis is a Gram-negative, non-spore-forming, slightly halophilic and non-motile bacteria from the genus Erythrobacter which has been isolated from sea water in Dokdo in Korea.

References

External links
Type strain of Porphyrobacter dokdonensis at BacDive -  the Bacterial Diversity Metadatabase	

Sphingomonadales
Bacteria described in 2006